Thien Hau Temple is the Vietnamese name for a Mazu temple, and can refer to:
Thien Hau Temple (Cholon), Ho Chi Minh City
Thien Hau Temple (Los Angeles)